Babawayil, also known as Baba Wayil and The dowry free village (Urdu : باباوائل / Kashmiri : بابہ ٕوٲیِل / Hindi : बाबावायिल) is a small village in Indian-administered Kashmir's Ganderbal district, around 30 km away from Srinagar, and at an elevation of 1786 meters (5859 feet). It is known for its banning of dowries.

References 

Villages in Ganderbal district